Mariken is a medieval Dutch name (Modern Dutch Marijke), and may refer to:

Mariken van Nieumeghen, a medieval Dutch prose text and its protagonist
Mariken van Nieumeghen (1974 film)
Mariken (2000 film)